The 2021–22 TFF First League was the 21st season since the league was established in 2001 and 59th season of the second-level football league of Turkey since its establishment in 1963–64.

Teams
Adana Demirspor, Giresunspor and Altay promoted to 2021–22 Süper Lig.
BB Erzurumspor, Ankaragücü, Gençlerbirliği and Denizlispor relegated from 2020–21 Süper Lig.
Eyüpspor, Manisa and Kocaelispor promoted from 2020–21 TFF Second League.
The bottom four teams will be relegated to the 2022–23 TFF Second League.

Stadiums and locations

Personnel and sponsorship

League table
<onlyinclude>

Results

Promotion Playoffs

Semifinals

|}

First leg

Second leg

Final

Statistics

Top goalscorers

References

External links 
  Turkish Football Federation PTT 1. League

Turkey
TFF First League seasons
2021–22 in Turkish football